Rashkov is a Bulgarian male surname, its feminine counterpart is Rashkova. It may refer to:
Genko Rashkov (1920–1996), Bulgarian Olympic equestrian
Radoslav Rashkov (born 1987), Bulgarian association football player
Valentina Rashkova, Bulgarian artistic gymnast

See also
 Rașcov
 Raszków

Bulgarian-language surnames